The Women's Premiership is the top level women's football league of Northern Ireland. The league was called the NIWFA Division League 1 until 2003 and Premier League until 2015. In 2016, it was rebranded the Women's Premiership and is run by the NI Football League since.

Eight teams play a double round robin to crown the champion, which qualifies for a spot in the UEFA Women's Champions League.
The eighth place gets relegated to the Women's Championship 1, the seventh place plays a two-legged relegation playoff against the runner up of the Women's Championship.

History
In women's football the first league season was played out in 1977. Organised by the Northern Ireland Women's Football Association (NIWFA) the league was simply called the NIWFA Division League 1.

In 2004 the Division 1 was replaced by the Women's Premier League.

In 2016, after 40 years of administering and developing women's football locally, the league was rebranded the Women's Premiership and is run now by the Northern Ireland Football League. The main sponsor and name giver is Danske Bank.

2022 Teams 
The following teams make up the 2022 season.

List of champions 
Before 2004 the winner of the Division 1 league was national champion. The first season was played out in 1977.

List only includes known titles (misses 1977-1998).

References

External links
 Official Site
 League at leaguewebsite.co.uk - Standings, results, fixtures
 women.soccerway.com; results, standings & fixtures
 2013–15 Website

North
1
Association football leagues in Northern Ireland
North
Football
Women's Premiership (Northern Ireland)